The 1998 winners of the Torneo di Viareggio (in English, the Viareggio Tournament, officially the Viareggio Cup World Football Tournament Coppa Carnevale), the annual youth football tournament held in Viareggio, Tuscany, are listed below.

Format
The 32 teams are seeded in 8 groups. Each team from a group meets the others in a single tie. The winning club and runners-up from each group progress to the final knockout stage. All matches in the final rounds are single tie. The Round of 16 envisions penalties and no extra time, while the rest of the final round matches include 30 minutes extra time and penalties to be played if the draw between teams still holds. Semifinal losing teams play 3rd-place final with penalties after regular time. The winning sides play the final with extra time and repeat the match if the draw holds.

Participating teams
Italian teams

  Atalanta
  Bari
  Bologna
  Cagliari
  Cremonese
  Empoli
  Fiorentina
  Foggia
  Genoa
  Inter Milan
  Juventus
  Lazio
  Lucchese
  Milan
  Napoli
  Parma
  Perugia
  Ravenna
  Roma
  Savoia
  Torino
  Udinese
  Venezia
  Viareggio

European teams

  Bayern München
  Manchester United
  Partizan

American teams

  Pumas
  Vitória
  Nacional
  Irineu

Oceanian teams
  Marconi Stallions

Group stage

Group 1

Group 2

Group 3

Group 4

Group 5

Group 6

Group 7

Group 8

Knockout stage

Champions

Footnotes

External links
 Official Site (Italian)
 Results on RSSSF.com

1998
1997–98 in Italian football
1997–98 in German football
1997–98 in Yugoslav football
1997–98 in English football
1997–98 in Mexican football
1998 in Brazilian football
1998 in Australian soccer